Eaton Site is a historic archeological site located at West Seneca in Erie County, New York. It contains a record of small, intermittently occupied campsites from the Early Archaic (c. 8000 BC) though the Late Woodland (c. 1200 AD) periods and an Iroquoian village dating to around 1550 AD. The site also contains materials from the early 19th century, when it was part of the Buffalo Creek Reservation, and traces of late 19th and 20th century materials. The land was sold in 1842 and the site was used as farmland until the early 1950s.

It was listed on the National Register of Historic Places in 1979.

References

Archaic period in North America
Hopewellian peoples
Iroquois populated places
Archaeological sites on the National Register of Historic Places in New York (state)
Archaeological sites in New York (state)
Geography of Erie County, New York
National Register of Historic Places in Erie County, New York